Mathew Amoah (born 24 October 1980) is a Ghanaian former professional footballer who played as a striker. From 2002 to 2011 he represented the Ghana national team at international level, scoring 12 goals in 45 matches.

Club career

Vitesse and Fortuna
Born in Tema, Amoah moved to the Netherlands at the age of 16, where he linked with Vitesse Arnhem, spending eight seasons at the club. His early departure from his homeland has led to an almost anonymous profile there because he never played any top-level club football in Ghana, although in Amoah's home town of Tema his achievements in Europe have not gone unnoticed. With three brothers, Amoah learned his craft on the streets of the Ghanaian town and at the age of 15, he was spotted by scouts from the Dutch club while playing in an international youth tournament for his club Great Ambassadors.

After Amoah moved to Vitesse, he did not play regularly. So in order to get regular playing action, Amoah needed a loan spell at Fortuna Sittard to find his feet in Dutch football before going back at Arnhem where coach Ronald Koeman gave him a chance. And the move paid off as the club's supporters named him their best player after the 2002–03 season, in which he scored 15 goals for the club and also competed in European club competition. Amoah trained at Vitesse where he developed into a good striker. It was his performances at Vitesse which gained him a call up to his homeland Ghana's national team. At Vitesse, he scored 62 goals in 174 appearances for the club.

Borussia Dortmund
Amoah signed with Borussia Dortmund in December 2005, during the winter transfer window, rejoining coach Bert van Marwijk, who managed him during the 1999–2000 season at another Dutch side, Fortuna Sittard. Amoah signed a two-year contract, but could only manage seventeen first-team appearances (going scoreless in the process) in one-and-a-half seasons. "There was a number of options but Amoah was the one the manager wanted", Hans-Joachim Watzke, Dortmund's finance director, told the Westfälische Rundschau at the time.

NAC Breda
The 26-year-old Amoah signed a three-year deal with the Eredivisie's NAC Breda on 3 July 2007, after a medical. The former Vitesse forward returned to the Netherlands after a lack of first-team opportunities at Dortmund. "We have been working on this deal for months", NAC technical director Earnie Stewart said. "First it looked like it was impossible for the player to sign, but this week negotiations went quicker."Amoah was instrumental in the attack of NAC Breda since his arrival in July 2007. He scored more than eight goals in every season at the club. He scored 11 goals in his first season, 12 in his second season and then nine in his third season. He was the top scorer of NAC Breda and was loved by the supporters for his spectacular goals which helped the club a lot. At the end of his five-year stay with the club played 105 league matches and scored 43 goals.

Mersin İdmanyurdu
Amoah signed a two-year contract with Mersin İdmanyurdu SK, the newly promoted Turkish club. He only played five matches for the team and left Turkey after one year.

SC Heerenveen
In June 2012, Amoah signed with Eredivisie side SC Heerenveen. However, after one season in which he played no single match for the club, he was released in June 2013.

International career

Ghana first selected Amoah ahead of the 2002 CAF Africa Cup of Nations and it was in the tournament in Mali where he made his debut. But after the Black Stars were eliminated in the quarter- finals, Amoah only ever received one more call-up before the appointment of coach Ratomir Dujkovic in December 2004. The Serb brought Amoah back for his first game in charge, and Amoah has been in the squad ever since.

An international since 2002 he made his debut on 21 January 2002, Segou in a Ghana, Morocco encounter at the Africa Cup of Nations: 2002, Amoah was an instrumental figure in Ghana's first qualification for the World Cup, scoring three goals in three consecutive and important qualifying matches. Matthew Amoah finished as Ghana's leading scorer in the 2010 FIFA World Cup qualifiers, his five strikes proving pivotal in the Black Stars' march to a second successive tournament. His tally added to the three goals he scored in the 2006 qualifiers that also made a major contribution to Ghana's march to their first-ever FIFA World Cup finals appearance. He also played in their World cup debut even though he did not score in any of the matches he played, his ability, runs and passes helped the team to the group of 16.

In 2010, he helped his nation qualify for another world cup. He played in two matches, which he was brought in as a substitute. He is a member of the Ghanaian Golden Era of footballers including Fulham right back John Paintsil and Chelsea versatile midfielder Michael Essien and former captain Stephen Appiah who formerly played for Italian Club Cesena, Fenerbahçe SK and Juventus. Amoah has scored 13 times in 40 appearances for Ghana.

Career statistics

Club

International

Honours
Ghana
Africa Cup of Nations Silver Medal: 2010
FIFA World Cup Round of 16: 2006
FIFA World Cup quarter-final: 2010

References

External links
 Matthew Amoah at Voetbal International  – 

1980 births
Living people
People from Tema
Ghanaian footballers
Association football forwards
SBV Vitesse players
Fortuna Sittard players
Borussia Dortmund players
NAC Breda players
SC Heerenveen players
Heracles Almelo players
Mersin İdman Yurdu footballers
Eredivisie players
Bundesliga players
Süper Lig players
Ghana international footballers
2002 African Cup of Nations players
2006 FIFA World Cup players
2006 Africa Cup of Nations players
2010 Africa Cup of Nations players
2010 FIFA World Cup players
Ghanaian expatriate footballers
Ghanaian expatriate sportspeople in the Netherlands
Expatriate footballers in the Netherlands
Ghanaian expatriate sportspeople in Germany
Expatriate footballers in Germany
Ghanaian expatriate sportspeople in Turkey
Expatriate footballers in Turkey